Andrew Coyle Bradley (February 12, 1844 – May 15, 1902) was an Associate Justice of the Supreme Court of the District of Columbia.

Education and career

Born in Washington, D.C., a grandson of Abraham Bradley Jr., Bradley attended Columbian University (now George Washington University) until serving in the quartermaster general and commissary general offices of the Union Army in Washington, D.C. during the American Civil War. He resumed his studies after the war, received a Bachelor of Laws from Harvard Law School in 1867, was admitted to the bar in Massachusetts, and practiced law in Washington, D.C. He also served as a Professor of Law at Columbian University.

Federal judicial service

Bradley was nominated by President Benjamin Harrison on March 19, 1889, to an Associate Justice seat on the Supreme Court of the District of Columbia (now the United States District Court for the District of Columbia) vacated by Associate Justice William Matthews Merrick. He was confirmed by the United States Senate on March 23, 1889, and received his commission the same day. His service terminated on May 15, 1902, due to his death in Washington, D.C. He was interred in Rock Creek Cemetery in Washington, D.C.

References

Sources
 

1844 births
1902 deaths
Harvard Law School alumni
Judges of the United States District Court for the District of Columbia
United States federal judges appointed by Benjamin Harrison
19th-century American judges
Burials at Rock Creek Cemetery